The Cuz I Love You Too Tour is the second headlining concert tour by American singer and rapper Lizzo in support of her third studio album, Cuz I Love You. The tour began on July 18, 2019, in Troutdale, Oregon, and concluded on January 15, 2020, in Auckland, New Zealand.

Background and development
On April 22, 2019, Lizzo announced dates for the "Cuz I Love You Too Tour" tour. Ari Lennox, Empress Of, and DJ Sophia Eris were announced as opening acts. European dates were added in July.

Setlist 
This setlist is representative of the show on September 11, 2019, in Miami Beach. It does not represent all the shows from the tour.

"Heaven Help Me"
"Worship"
"Cuz I Love You"
"Exactly How I Feel"
"Scuse Me"
"Water Me"
"Jerome"
"Crybaby"
"Tempo"
"Boys"
"Like a Girl"
"Soulmate"
"Lingerie"
"Good as Hell"
"Truth Hurts"
Encore
 "Juice"

Tour dates

Cancelled shows

Notes

References

Lizzo concert tours
2019 concert tours
2020 concert tours
Concert tours cancelled due to the COVID-19 pandemic